Stalin vs. Martians is a parody real-time strategy video game developed by Black Wing Foundation, Dreamlore and N-Game, released on April 29, 2009. Described as "trashy and over-the-top" by its creators, the game mocks World War II strategy games and utilizes pythonesque humor. The developers state that Stalin vs. Martians is "obviously a parody, which sometimes gets close to being a satire" and is "halfway to becoming a trash icon of gaming industry for years". In some interviews the lead designer of the game compares Stalin vs. Martians to the Troma films.

In July, following the game's release, it became no longer available to be purchased, for unknown reasons. The official website claimed that an upgraded version of Stalin vs. Martians would soon be released, but the game was never made available again, neither in original or upgraded version.

This game uses the same updated version of the Enigma Engine as Blitzkrieg 2.

Reception
Stalin vs. Martians received scathing reviews from critics. It has an average score of 23.41% on GameRankings as well as 25% on Metacritic. GameSpot awarded the game 1.5/10, calling it "perhaps the worst RTS game ever created". The site also named it 2009's Flat-Out Worst Game. IGN, which rated the game a 2/10, noted the game's total lack of any RTS-related elements and asked whether it was 'made in 1994 and sealed into a vault until 2009' given how dated the visuals looked. Resolution, awarding the game 35%, warned readers not to purchase the game, but conceded that it is occasionally "incredibly amusing". Rock, Paper, Shotgun called the game "rubbish" but admitted: "there’s certainly car-crash value, especially if you tie yourself in theoretical knots deciding exactly how much of the game is satire". The Escapist was more positive, specifically to its game's Soviet clichés and the presentation as funny and absurd at the same time. Russian MTV programme Virtuality and its spin-off portal Games TV were quite enthusiastic about the game and its humour.

See also
List of video games notable for negative reception

Notes

External links
 Official website
 Stalin vs. Martians group on Mezmer Games website
 Official trailer on YouTube

2009 video games
Windows games
Windows-only games
Real-time strategy video games
Cold War video games
Video games about World War II alternate histories
Alternate history video games
Video games set on Mars
Video games developed in Ukraine
Parody video games
Video games set in the Soviet Union
Works about Joseph Stalin
Cultural depictions of Joseph Stalin
Video games based on real people
Single-player video games